The canton of Saint-Georges-en-Couzan is a French former administrative division located in the department of Loire and the Rhône-Alpes region. It was disbanded following the French canton reorganisation which came into effect in March 2015. It consisted of 9 communes, which joined the canton of Boën-sur-Lignon in 2015. It had 3,662 inhabitants (2012).

The canton comprised the following communes:

Chalmazel
Châtelneuf
Jeansagnière
Palogneux
Sail-sous-Couzan
Saint-Bonnet-le-Courreau
Saint-Georges-en-Couzan
Saint-Just-en-Bas
Sauvain

See also
Cantons of the Loire department

References

Former cantons of Loire (department)
2015 disestablishments in France
States and territories disestablished in 2015